The following lists events that happened during 1844 in New Zealand.

Population
The estimated population of New Zealand at the end of 1844 is 73,900 Māori and 12,447 non-Māori.

Incumbents

Regal and viceregal
Head of State – Queen Victoria
Governor – Captain Robert Fitzroy

Government and law
Chief Justice – William Martin

Events 
 26 January: Governor Robert FitzRoy arrives in Wellington to investigate the Wairau Affray.
 February: The Bay of Islands Advocate ceases publishing. It began in 1843.
25 September: The New Zealand Gazette and Wellington Spectator prints its final issue. 369 issues were produced.
12 October: The New Zealand Spectator and Cook's Strait Guardian begins publishing in Wellington. It publishes weekly until its demise in 1865.

Births

Unknown date
 (in Ireland): James Colvin, politician.
 John Sheehan, politician.

Deaths
 10 October: Tuhawaiki, tribal leader

Unknown date
Te Pareihe, tribal leader

See also
List of years in New Zealand
Timeline of New Zealand history
History of New Zealand
Military history of New Zealand
Timeline of the New Zealand environment
Timeline of New Zealand's links with Antarctica

References